Nuelles is a former commune in the Rhône department in Rhône-Alpes region in eastern France.

On 1 January 2013, Nuelles and Saint-Germain-sur-l'Arbresle merged becoming one commune called Saint-Germain-Nuelles.

References

Former communes of Rhône (department)